Gregory Scott Booker (June 22, 1960 – March 30, 2019) was a professional baseball pitcher. He pitched in all or part of eight seasons in Major League Baseball, from 1983 until 1990. Booker's best season was probably in 1987. He made 44 appearances (all in relief) posting a very respectable 3.16 ERA, won 1 game and picked up his only career save on May 10, 1987, against the Cubs. Amazingly, it came in a game that the Padres won by the lopsided score of 14–2. Booker pitched the final 3 innings to preserve the win for starting pitcher Ed Whitson. He also served as a coach for the San Diego Padres from 1997 until 2003, the first four years as bullpen coach, then a season-plus as pitching coach. He was a scout for the Los Angeles Dodgers.

Booker's widow, Kristi, is the daughter of long-time major league manager Jack McKeon. His son Zach Booker was a catcher in the minor leagues from 2007 until 2011. In 2022 he was hired on as head baseball coach for the D3 Guilford Quakers.  His son Avery was the head baseball coach for Greensboro College in Greensboro, NC

On June 29, 1989, McKeon, often called "Trader Jack", traded his own son-in-law to the Minnesota Twins for pitcher Freddie Toliver.

He died of melanoma on March 30, 2019.

References

External links

1960 births
2019 deaths
Baseball players from Virginia
Colorado Rockies scouts
Deaths from cancer in North Carolina
Deaths from melanoma
Las Vegas Stars (baseball) players
Los Angeles Dodgers scouts
Major League Baseball bullpen coaches
Major League Baseball pitchers
Major League Baseball pitching coaches
Minnesota Twins players
Phoenix Firebirds players
Portland Beavers players
Reno Padres players
San Diego Padres coaches
San Diego Padres players
San Francisco Giants players
Walla Walla Padres players
Syracuse Chiefs coaches
Sportspeople from Lynchburg, Virginia